Everöd is a locality situated in Kristianstad Municipality, Skåne County, Sweden with 885 inhabitants in 2010.

Kristianstad Airport, which is sometimes referred to as "Everöd Airport" by locals, is located close to Everöd. The Romanesque Everöd Church is located in Everöd.

References 

Populated places in Kristianstad Municipality
Populated places in Skåne County